Fingering is typically the use of fingers or hands to sexually stimulate the vulva (including the clitoris) or vagina. Vaginal fingering is legally and medically called digital penetration or digital penetration of the vagina. Fingering may also include the use of fingers to sexually stimulate the anus.

Fingering may be performed on oneself (masturbation) or by or with a sexual partner. When performed on the vulva or vagina by a sexual partner, it is a form of mutual masturbation, and is analogous to a handjob (the manual stimulation of the penis). It may be used for sexual arousal or foreplay, constitute an entire sexual encounter, or be used as a form of non-penetrative sexual activity.

Stimulation

Vulva 

Parts of the vulva, especially the clitoris, are erogenous zones. Massage of the vulva, and in particular the clitoris is the most common way for a woman to achieve an orgasm. Studies indicate that 7080 percent of women require direct clitoral stimulation to achieve orgasm.  The clitoral glans or shaft may be massaged, usually through the skin of the clitoral hood, using up-and-down, side-to-side, or circular motions. The rest of the genitals are also stimulated by fingering.

Vagina 

While the vagina is not especially sensitive as a whole, its lower third (the area close to the entrance) has concentrations of the nerve endings that can provide pleasurable sensations when stimulated during sexual activity.

Fingering the vagina is often performed to stimulate an area which may be termed the G-spot. The G-spot is reportedly located roughly  up on the anterior wall of the vagina, forwards toward the navel. It is described as being recognized by its ridges and slightly rougher texture compared to the more cushion-like vaginal cavity walls around it. Fingering this spot, and in effect possibly stimulating the Skene's gland, is commonly cited as a method that may lead to female ejaculation.

Some women have cited the "come hither" approach as a significant catalyst to orgasm. This technique involves the middle finger, sometimes additionally the index or ring finger, making a hand gesture like "come here" with the palm facing upwards towards her pubic bone. Medical professionals suggest washing the hands before contact with the vagina, to ensure proper hygiene, especially when moving between different orifices.

Anus 

Anal fingering may be pleasurable because of the large number of nerve endings in the anal area, and because of the added stimulation gained from stretching the anal sphincter muscles while inserting the finger. A good quality personal lubricant is advisable to both increase the pleasurable sensation and aid insertion. Some people prefer to simply stimulate the outer ring of the anus, while others will follow this by inserting one or more fingers. Fingering may be seen as an act in itself or as an arousing prelude in preparation for further anal sex. Anal fingering can arouse the receiver, allowing them to relax their anus and prepare them for the insertion of a penis or any other sexual instrument.

Anal fingering is also an effective way of stimulating the prostate in males and thus may bring the receiver to orgasm. 

Anal fingering can also stimulate the perineal sponge in women.

Safety and sexual assault 

Fingering is generally considered safe sex.

How digital penetration without consent is classified legally depends on the jurisdiction. For example, penetration of the vagina or anus with a finger without consent is rape in Australia and forcible rape in the United States.  In Scotland, the term rape is only used for penetration with a penis, whereas penetration with a finger can be "sexual assault by penetration".

See also 

 Fisting

References

Fingers
Anal eroticism
Sexual acts
Female masturbation
Vulva